Victor Payumo Silayan (January 31, 1929 – August 30, 1987), commonly known as Vic Silayan, was a Filipino actor who is best known for his roles in Kisapmata (1981) and Karnal (1983).

Personal life
He was born in Gapan, Nueva Ecija, Philippine Islands (then a US commonwealth territory from 1898-1946. Hence, all born in the Philippines just like Guam, Puerto Rico, American Samoa are considered US Nationals). He was a good friend of Manila Police Detective/Investigator Lt. Benito Sebastian-Ramos Deguzman, (father of Florante "Randy" Deguzman, a Realtor in Orange County, California, USA). Vic and Benny were peers in Nueva Ecija High School and their "messenger" to do nasty things then was the actress Nida Blanca, a few years younger than them. They all eventually moved to Metro Manila. Vic is the father of Chat Silayan and grandfather of Victor Silayan.

Death
Silayan died of a heart attack on August 30, 1987.

Filmography

Film

American Guerrilla in the Philippines (1950) - Japanese General (uncredited)
Huk sa Bagong Pamumuhay (1953) - Captain Mendoza
Hiyasmin (1953)
Lapu-Lapu (1955) - Arturo
Higit sa Lahat (1955) - Totoy
Dalagang Taring (1955)
Salamangkero (1955)
Anak Dalita (1956) - Father Fidel
Dalawang Ina (1957)
Badjao (1957) - Jikiri
Troop 11 (1957)
Malvarosa (1958) - Melanio
Kundiman ng lahi (1959)
Mr. Announcer (1959) - Lundagin Mo Baby
Basilio Baston (1962)
No Man Is an Island (1962) - Major Hondo
Death Was a Stranger (1963)
Cry of Battle (1963) - Capt. Garcia
Zigzag (1963)
Scout Rangers (1964)
Strike! (1965)
The Ravagers (1965) - Captain Mori
Sa Bawa't Hakbang... Panganib (1965)
Pedrong Hunyango (1965)
Karate sa Karate (1965)
Pilipinas Kong Mahal (1965)
Anghel sa Aking Balikat (1965)
A Portrait of the Artist as Filipino (1965) - Vito
Counter Spy (1966)
Operation XYZ (1966)
Combat Bataan (1966)
Zamboanga (1966)
Sarhento Aguila at ang 9 na Magigiting (1966)
Kill... Tony Falcon (1966)
Dugo ang kulay ng pag-Ibig (1966)
Ito ang Pilipino (1966)
Badong Baldado (1966)
Cobra Challenges the Jokers (1967)
The Longest Hundred Miles (1967) - Japanese General (uncredited)
Roman Montalan (1967)
Masquerade (1967) - Judge Dante Soriano
Carnap (1967)
Boy Aguila (1967)
Ang kan ng haragan (1967)
Suntok o karate (1968)
The Karate Champions (1968)
Target Captain Karate (1968)
Destination Vietnam (1968)
Cuadro de Jack (1968)
Combat Killers (1968)
Gagamba at si Scorpio (1969)
Ang ninong kong Nazareno (1969)
Kalinga (1969)
Perlas ng silangan (1969)
Simon bastardo (1970) - Padre Martin
The Sky Divers (1970)
Heredera (1970)
Code Name: Apollo (1970) - Gerry Valencia
The Secret of the Sacred Forest (1970)
Blood Thirst (1971) - Calderon
Lilet (1971)
Night of the Cobra Woman (1972) - Dr. Tezon
Kill the Pushers (1972)
Daughters of Satan (1972) - Dr. Dangal
Erap Is My Guy (1973)
Paruparong Itim (1973)
Ambrose Dugal (1973)
Ang bukas ay atin (1973)
Dragnet (1973)
Ander di saya si Erap (1973)
Ikaw lamang (1973)
Ransom (1974)
Batingaw (1974)
Master Samurai (1974)
South Seas (1974)
Manila Connection (1974)
Mister Mo, Lover Boy Ko (1975)
Huwag pamarisan, Mister Mo. Lover Boy Ko (1975)
Diligin Mo ng Hamog ang Uhaw na Lupa (1975) - Vicente Zarcan (segment 4)
Sa kagubatan ng lunsod (1975)
Kumander Agimat (1975)
Hiwaga (1975)
Diligin mo ng hamog ang uhaw na lupa (1975)
Mahiwagang kris (1975)
Ang pag-ibig ko'y huwag mong sukatin (1975)
Cui hua du jiang tou (1975)
Ligaw Na bulaklak (1976)
Alas Singko ng Hapon, Gising Na ang Mga Anghel (1976)
Bata Pa si Sabel (1976)
Project: Kill (1976) - Chief Insp. Cruz
Ursula (1976)
Markadong Anghel (1976)
Makamandag si Adora (1976) - The Judge
Scotch on the Rocks to Remember... Bitter Coffee to Forget (1976)
Kapangyarihan ni Eva (1977)
Too Hot to Handle (1977) - District Attorney
Mag-ingat Ka... Ikaw ang Susunod! (1977)
Gomburza (1977)
Pinakasalan Ko ang Ina ng Aking Kapatid (1977)
Phandora (1977)
Nananabik (1977)
Huwag Mong Dungisan ang Pisngi ng Langit (1977)
Katawang Alabok (1978)
Roberta (1979)
Menor de Edad (1979)
Okey Lang Basta't Kapiling Kita (1979)
Nangyari sa Kagubatan (1979)
Bakit May Pag-Ibig Pa? (1979)
Pacific Inferno (1979) - Fukoshima
Dalagang Pinagtaksilan ng Panahon, Ang (1979)
Star (1979)
Nang Bumuka ang Sampaguita (1980)
Galing-galing Mo Mrs. Jones, Ang (1980)
The Children of An Lac (1980, TV Movie) - Dr. Dan
Taga sa Panahon (1980)
Langis at Tubig (1980) - The Judge
The Last Reunion (1980) - Raoul Amante
Bantay Salakay (1981)
Tondo Girl (1981)
Jag Rodnar (1981) - Domingo de Jesus
Kisapmata (1981) - Sgt. Diosdado Carandang
Karma (1981) - Psychiatrist
Waywaya (1982)
Malikot (1982) - Raffy Almonte
Friends in Love (1983)
Jun Parak (1983)
Paano Ba ang Mangarap? (1983)
Tatak ng Yakuza (1983)
Karnal (1983) - Gusting
Commander Firefox (1983)
Dapat Ka Bang Mahalin? (1984) - Victor
Basag ang Pula (1984) - Atty. Abad
Sa Hirap at Ginhawa (1984) - Abe Ventura
Ano ang Kulay ng Mukha ng Diyos (1985) - Prison Superintendent
Mabuhay Ka sa Baril (1986)
I Love You Mama, I Love You Papa (1986) - Don Lorico Villena
Maharlika (1987) - Colonel Murai
Tigershark (1987) - Colonel Barro (final film role)

Television
Pangarap ni Buhay (1973–1975)
Guni Guni (1977-1978)
Flordeluna (1978–1982)
Mirasol del Cielo (1986–1987)

References

External links

Vic Silayan: An Actor Remembers on YouTube

1929 births
1987 deaths
20th-century Filipino male actors
Ateneo de Manila University alumni
Burials at the Manila Memorial Park – Sucat
Filipino male film actors